Senec District (okres Senec) is a district in the Bratislava Region of western Slovakia. It had been established in 1996. The district is largely a bedroom community for Bratislava and is also known for its recreational possibilities, foremost the area of Slnečné jazerá (Sunny Lakes). The administrative seat is its largest town, Senec. The whole district contains 34 623 free-standing houses.

Municipalities
Bernolákovo
Blatné
Boldog
Čataj
Dunajská Lužná
Hamuliakovo
Hrubá Borša
Hrubý Šúr
Hurbanova Ves
Chorvátsky Grob
Igram
Ivanka pri Dunaji
Kalinkovo
Kaplná
Kostolná pri Dunaji
Kráľová pri Senci
Malinovo
Miloslavov
Most pri Bratislave
Nová Dedinka
Nový Svet
Reca
Rovinka
Senec
Tomášov
Tureň
Veľký Biel
Vlky
Zálesie

References

Districts of Slovakia
Geography of Bratislava Region